Hilmar Weilandt (born 29 September 1966) is a former East German international footballer.

He spent all of his professional career at FC Hansa Rostock.

He is the father of fellow footballer Tom Weilandt.

Honours
 DDR-Oberliga: 1991
 FDGB-Pokal: 1991; runner-up 1987

References

External links
 
 
 

1966 births
Living people
People from Stralsund
Association football midfielders
German footballers
East German footballers
East Germany international footballers
FC Hansa Rostock players
Bundesliga players
2. Bundesliga players
DDR-Oberliga players
Footballers from Mecklenburg-Western Pomerania